Kyle Henry Hebert  is an American voice actor and DJ who works for anime and video game series, such as the teenage/adult Gohan and the narrator in the Funimation dub of the Dragon Ball series, Sōsuke Aizen in Bleach, Ryu in the Street Fighter video game series, Kiba Inuzuka in Naruto, Kamina in Gurren Lagann, Ryuji Suguro in Blue Exorcist, Noriaki Kakyoin in JoJo's Bizarre Adventure: Stardust Crusaders, Dribble and Dr. Crygor in WarioWare Gold, and Big the Cat in Sonic the Hedgehog.

Career

Hebert got his start in voice-over during the mid-1990s as a disc jockey for Radio Disney, under the pseudonym Squeege. This lasted until September 2005, when he moved from Dallas to Los Angeles, to get bigger interests in the world of voice acting.

He had cameo roles in various anime dubs such as Case Closed, Fruits Basket, and One Piece with recurring roles including Fullmetal Alchemist, Kiba Inuzuka on Naruto, Sōsuke Aizen and Ganju Shiba in Bleach, Kamina in Gurren Lagann, Gohan in the Dragon Ball series, Ryu in the Street Fighter series, and Big the Cat in the Sonic the Hedgehog series in 2010.

In 2009 and 2011, he voiced "The Sniper" in the animated spoof of Dirty Harry films entitled Magnum Farce and is set to reprise the expanded role of Blivit, The Sniper and that of Governor Arnold Schwartzenherzen-Geldengrubber in the feature film currently in production.

At Anime Expo 2009, Kyle won Best English Voice Actor in the SPJA Awards for his role as Kamina in Gurren Lagann. He is also a podcaster, co-founding and hosting the weekly BigBaldBroadcast with his long-time friend, known only as "Otherworld" Steve.

Personal life
On July 10, 2015, Hebert proposed to Christina Louise, an author whom goes by the pen name Ryter Rong. They married on February 14, 2018.

He has a daughter, Kayla Marie Hebert, who was born in 1996.

Hebert revealed his autism diagnosis on Twitter in 2017.

Hebert is originally from Lake Charles, Louisiana, approximately two hours from Houston, Texas.

Filmography

Anime
{| class="wikitable sortable plainrowheaders" style="width=95%; font-size: 95%;"
|+ List of English dubbing performances in anime
|-
! style="background:#b0c4de; width:55px;" | Year
! style="background:#b0c4de;" | Series
! style="background:#b0c4de;" | Role
! style="background:#b0c4de;" class="unsortable" | Notes
! style="background:#b0c4de;" class="unsortable" | Source
|-
| –2003; 2005 || Dragon Ball Z || Gohan (Older), Narrator, Ox King, others || Funimation dub || Resume
|-
| –13 || Bleach || Ganju Shiba, Sōsuke Aizen, Kaien Shiba, Nirgge Parduoc ||  || Website
|-
|  || Eureka Seven || Ken-Goh || Season 2 || Website
|-
|  || Higurashi: When They Cry || Jirō Tomitake ||   || Website
|-
|  || Ergo Proxy || MCQ ||   || Website
|-
|  || MÄR || Peta ||   || Resume
|-
|  || Ghost in the Shell: Solid State Society || Munei, Detective, CSI Tech ||   || Website
|-
|  || The Third: The Girl with the Blue Eye || Various characters ||   || Website
|-
|  || Mega Man Star Force || Omega-Xis ||   || Website
|-
|  || Digimon Data Squad || Belphemon ||   || Website
|-
|  || Hell Girl || Yoshiyuki Kusuno ||   || Resume
|-
|  || Tweeny Witches || Luca ||   || Resume
|-
|  || Blue Dragon || Gilliam, Legolas ||   || Website
|-
|  || Buso Renkin || Hiwatari ||   || Website
|-
|  || Lucky Star || Various characters ||   || Website
|-
| –present || One Piece || Nefertari Cobra, Capone Bege, Higuma, Nola, others ||   || Website
|-

|-
|  || Gurren Lagann || Kamina || Best English Voice Actor, Male, Society for the Promotion of Japanese Animation, 2009 || Website
|-
|  || Moribito: Guardian of the Spirit || Sun, Jiguro Muso ||   || Website
|-
|  || Freedom Project || Gosche ||   || Resume
|-
|  || Ouran High School Host Club || Kazukiyo Soga ||   || Resume
|-
|  || Darker than Black || Reiji Kikuchi ||   || Resume
|-
|  || Ghost Slayers Ayashi || Hozaburo Ogasawara||   || Website
|-
|  || Kenichi: The Mightiest Disciple || Tsukaba ||   || Resume
|-
|  || Shigurui: Death Frenzy || Naotsugu Andou ||   || Resume
|-
|  || D.Gray-man || George the Mayor ||   || Resume
|-

|-
|  || Blade of the Immortal || Shido ||   || Resume
|-
|  || Honey and Clover || Ippei, Asai, Lohmeyer ||   || Website
|-
| –19 || Naruto: Shippuden || Kiba Inuzuka, Inoichi, Akatsuchi, others ||   || Website
|-
|  || Monster || Maurer, Fritz Vardemann ||   || Resume
|-
|  || Soul Eater || Masamune Nakatsukasa ||   || Website
|-
|  || Fullmetal Alchemist: Brotherhood || Vato Falman ||   || Resume
|-
|  || Initial D: First Stage || Mr. Tsuchiya || Ep. 23 || 
|-
| –132017–18 || Dragon Ball Z Kai || Gohan (Older), Ox King, Narrator, others || Also The Final Chapters ||   
|-
|  || Eden of the East || Kiba ||   || Website
|-
|  || Durarara!! || Horada ||   || Resume
|-
|  || Puella Magi Madoka Magica || Tomohisa Kaname ||   || Resume
|-

|-
|  || Fate/Zero || Berserker ||   || 
|-
|  || Nura: Rise of the Yokai Clan || Aotabo ||   || 
|-
|  || Blue Exorcist || Ryuji "Bon" Suguro  ||   || 
|-
|  || Tenkai Knights || Beag, Eurus ||   || Website
|-
| –15 || Digimon Fusion || Ballistamon, Dorulumon, Greymon, others ||   || 
|-
|  || Fate/Zero || Berserker ||   || 
|-
|  || Pokémon Origins || Professor Oak ||   || Website
|-
|  || Ikki Tousen || Kanshou Kochuu || Great Guardians, Xtreme Xecutor series || 
|-
|  || JoJo's Bizarre Adventure: Stardust Crusaders || Noriaki Kakyoin ||   || Website
|-
|  || Attack on Titan || Mitabi Jarnach ||   || 
|-
|  || Sushi Ninja || Nacho Snake, Narrator ||   || 
|-
|  || Blood Lad || Dek ||   || 
|-
|  || Gargantia on the Verdurous Planet || Crown, Marocchi ||   || Website
|-
|  || Kill la Kill || Hojo || Ep. 8 || Website
|-
| –15 || Rock Lee and His Ninja Pals || Narrator, others ||   || Website
|-
|  || The Seven Deadly Sins || Escanor, Weinheidt, Dale, Dana ||   || Website
|-
|  || Hunter × Hunter || Umori, Masta, Morel Mackernasey others || 2011 series || Website
|-
|  || One-Punch Man || Atomic Samurai, Bespectacled Worker, Kamakyuri  || || Website
|-
|  || God Eater || Lindow Amamiya || || 
|-
|  || | Pokémon Generations || Eusine || || Website
|-
|2017
| Kabaneri of the Iron Fortress
|Kibito
|Also in movie 'Kabaneri of the Iron Fortress: The Battle of Unato'
|
|-
|2017
| Mob Psycho 100
|Toichiro Suzuki
|Also season 2
|-
| –2019 || Dragon Ball Super || Gohan (Older), Future Gohan, Ox-King, others || Funimation dub ||
|-
| –present || Baki || Spec || Netflix  || 
|-
| 2018 || Sword Gai The Animation || Mystery Face A, Shuntaro Sekiya || Netflix  ||
|-
| 2018 || Last Hope || Doug Horvant || || Netflix
|-
|  || Granblue Fantasy The Animation || Rackam || ||
|-
|  || Boruto: Naruto Next Generations || Kiba Inuzuka, Jūgo || for Jūgo's role, Hebert replaces Travis Willingham ||
|-
| -present || My Hero Academia || Fat Gum || ||
|-
| -present || Welcome to Demon School! Iruma-kun || Sullivan || ||
|-
|  || Somali and the Forest Spirit || Golem || ||
|-
|  || Beastars || Sanou, Boss || || 
|-
|2020
|Demon Slayer: Kimetsu no Yaiba
|Kanamori
|
|
|-
|  || Pokémon Journeys || Referee Dan || Flash of the Titans!, The Climb to Be the Very Best! || Website
|-
|}

Live action series dubbing

Animation

Film

Video games

Film

References

External links
 
 
 
 Kyle Hebert at Crystal Acids (English Voice Actor & Production Staff Database)
 

1969 births
Living people
People from Lake Charles, Louisiana
People from Dallas
People from Los Angeles
American male video game actors
American male voice actors
American DJs
Capcom people
Male actors from Los Angeles
Radio Disney DJs
Radio personalities from Dallas
University of North Texas alumni
20th-century American male actors
21st-century American male actors
People on the autism spectrum
Twitch (service) streamers